Akif, Akef or Aqif is an Arabic masculine given name, meaning "focused, attached, intent, devoted"

It may also refer to one who sits in itikaf during the last 10 days of Ramadan, devoting oneself to ibadah during these days and staying away from worldly affairs. This name is mentioned in Sura Al-Baqara

Given name 
Akef Al-Fayez, Jordanian Politician
Akif Šeremet, Bosnian communist
 Akif Pirinçci, German writer of Turkish origin

Surname
 Mohammed Mahdi Akef, Egyptian Islamist
 Naima Akef, Egyptian belly dancer 
 Mehmet Akif (disambiguation)

References

Arabic-language surnames
Arabic masculine given names
Turkish masculine given names